Samy Bengio is a Canadian computer scientist, Senior Director of AI and Machine Learning Research at Apple, and a former long-time scientist at Google known for leading a large group of researchers working in machine learning including adversarial settings. Bengio left Google shortly after the company fired his reportee, Timnit Gebru, without first notifying him. At the time, Bengio said that he had been "stunned" by what happened to Gebru. He is also among the three authors who developed Torch in 2002, the ancestor of PyTorch, one of today's two largest machine learning frameworks.

Education 
Bengio obtained his Ph.D. in Computer Science in 1993 with a thesis titled Optimization of a Parametric Learning Rule for Neural Networks from the Université de Montréal. Before that, Bengio got an M.Sc. in Computer Science in 1989 with a thesis on Integration of Traditional and Intelligence Tutoring Systems from the same university, together with a B.Sc. in Computer Science in 1986.

Scientific contributions 
According to DBLP, Samy Bengio has authored around 250 scientific papers on neural networks, machine learning, deep learning, statistics, computer vision and natural language processing. The most cited of these include some of the early works sparking the 2010s deep learning revolution by showing how to explore the many learned representations obtained through deep learning, one of the first deep learning approaches to image captioning, efforts to understand why deep learning works leading to many follow-up works. He also worked on the first evidence that adversarial examples can exist in the real world, i.e. one can really change a physical object such that a machine learning system would be fooled and one of the first works on zero-shot recognition, i.e., recognizing  classes never seen during training.

Professional activities 
Bengio worked at the IDIAP Research Institute and the École Polytechnique Fédérale de Lausanne in Switzerland, from 1999 to 2007.

He was General Chair of the Conference on Neural Information Processing Systems (NeurIPS) in 2018  served as program chair of NeurIPS in 2017 and is currently a board member. He was also program chair of ICLR (2015-2016) and sits on its board (2018-2020).

Bengio is also an editor of the Journal of Machine Learning Research.

Personal life 
Samy Bengio was born to two Moroccan Jews who emigrated to France and Canada. He is the brother of Turing Award winner Yoshua Bengio. Both of them lived in Morocco for a year during their father's military service in Morocco. His father, Carlo Bengio, was a pharmacist who wrote theatre pieces and ran a Sephardic theatrical troupe in Montreal that played Judeo-Arabic pieces. His mother, Célia Moreno, is also an artist who played in one of the major theatre scenes of Morocco that was run by Tayeb Seddiki in the 1970s.

References 

1965 births
Living people
Moroccan-Jewish diaspora
Machine learning researchers